This is the list of all Wolverhampton Wanderers' European matches. The club's first entry into European competitions was the 1958–59 European Cup, with their most recent being the 2019–20 UEFA Europa League. They reached the UEFA Europa League quarter-finals for the 2019–20 season where they were defeated 1-0 by Sevilla. The best result was reaching the final of the 1971–72 UEFA Cup, that they lost 3–2 on aggregate against Tottenham Hotspur.

European final
Wolverhampton Wanderers's score listed first

Overall record

Legend: GF = Goals For. GA = Goals Against. GD = Goal Difference.

Pld = Matches played; W = Matches won; D = Matches drawn; L = Matches lost; GF = Goals for; GA = Goals against. Defunct competitions indicated in italics.

Matches

References 

European football
English football clubs in international competitions